Interstate 264 is the designation for two Interstate Highways in the United States, both of which are related to Interstate 64:
Interstate 264 (Kentucky), a bypass of Louisville, Kentucky
Interstate 264 (Virginia), a route through Norfolk, Virginia and a spur to Virginia Beach, Virginia

64-2
2